The Women's K-1 500 metres event at the 2015 Southeast Asian Games took place on 8 June 2015 in Singapore's Marina Channel.

Six competitors participated in this event, each representing either Malaysia, Singapore, Vietnam, Thailand, Indonesia, or Myanmar.

Schedule
All times are Singapore Standard Time (UTC+08:00)

Start list

Results

Final

References

External links
SEA Games 2015 - Canoeing Sport Schedule

Canoeing at the 2015 Southeast Asian Games
Women's sports competitions in Singapore
2015 in women's canoeing